Amleset Muchie (born 5 April 1987)  is an Ethiopian model, actress, and filmmaker. She is the wife of Ethiopian singer Teddy Afro since 2012.

Early life and career
Amleset was born in Addis Ababa, Ethiopia on 5 April 1987. She studied filmmaking at the New York Film Academy and journalism at Unity University in Addis Ababa.

Amleset was the winner of the 2004 Miss University beauty pageant, representing Ethiopia. She was also the winner of the Miss World Ethiopia pageant in 2006.

Additionally, Amleset is a filmmaker. She wrote and produced the movies Sile Fikir, Adoption, and the documentary Green Ethiopia.

Amleset serves as the spokeswoman for the Etete Dairy products in Ethiopia. She has also been outspoken about environmental issues facing Ethiopia.

Amleset participated in the UN 2018 Women First 5 kilometres run that took place on 11 March 2018 in Addis Ababa, Ethiopia. She won Icon Women's race in a time of 25.25.

Personal life
On 27 September 2012, Amleset married Ethiopian singer Teddy Afro at the Holy Trinity Cathedral in Addis Ababa. They have three children together. In October 2022, Amleset expected the fourth child and prepared a baby shower program.

Filmography

Film

Documentary

Music videos

References

1987 births
Living people
Ethiopian film actresses
21st-century Ethiopian actresses
21st-century Ethiopian women
Ethiopian beauty pageant winners
Ethiopian film directors
Ethiopian models
New York Film Academy alumni
People from Addis Ababa